Gary Donald Marocchi (born 24 April 1955, in Western Australia) is an Australian football (soccer) coach and former player. He is currently the President of the Perth Soccer Club.

Playing career 
Marocchi represented Australia 13 times in full internationals playing as a midfielder. His playing career at club level began in Perth in 1971 with Perth Azzurri in the Western Australia State League and concluded in 1980 with Adelaide City in the National Soccer League. He represented Western Australia 22 times and South Australia three times.

Coaching career 
Marocchi's first venture into coaching at semi-professional level was with Perth Italia in 1991. He remained at Perth Italia until he joined Perth Kangaroos where in 1994 he coached the Kangaroos to the FAS Premier League league title. When Perth Glory entered the National Soccer League in 1996 Marocchi was chosen to lead the new team. His tenure saw the Glory narrowly miss the post-season final series in each of his two seasons in charge. He was replaced by Bernd Stange before the beginning of the 1998–99 season. In 2003, he joined Swan IC in the WA State League where he coached until June 2005 when he resigned, stating player performance issues as one reason for his departure.

Footnotes

References 

1955 births
Living people
Soccer players from Perth, Western Australia
Australian people of Italian descent
Australian soccer players
Australia international soccer players
National Soccer League (Australia) players
Adelaide City FC players
Perth Glory FC managers
Association football midfielders
Australian soccer coaches